is a Japanese football player. He plays for Vegalta Sendai.

Career
Takumi Sasaki joined J1 League club Vegalta Sendai in 2016.

Club statistics
Updated to end of 2018 season.

References

External links
Profile at Kamatamare Sanuki

1998 births
Living people
Association football people from Miyagi Prefecture
Japanese footballers
J1 League players
Vegalta Sendai players
J2 League players
Tokushima Vortis players
Kamatamare Sanuki players
Renofa Yamaguchi FC players
Association football midfielders